National Route 244 is a national highway of Japan connecting Abashiri, Hokkaidō and Nemuro, Hokkaidō in Japan, with a total length of 153.9 km (95.63 mi).

References

National highways in Japan
Roads in Hokkaido